Joshua's Battle Against the Amalekites or Joshua's Victory over the Amalekites is a c. 1625 oil on canvas painting by Nicolas Poussin, now in the Hermitage Museum in Saint Petersburg. 

It was produced as a pendant to The Battle between the Israelites and the Amorites by the same artist during his time in Rome. He fell into dire financial straits after the 1625 death of his patron, the poet Giovan Battista Marino and cardinal Francesco Barberini (1597–1679)'s departure from the city - this forced him to sell both works. They were both acquired by Catherine II of Russia to be kept in Poussin's cousin Gaspar Dughet's home on via Paolina in Rome. The pair was only split up in 1927.

References

Bibliography

External links
  

Paintings in the collection of the Hermitage Museum
Paintings by Nicolas Poussin
War paintings
1625 paintings
Paintings depicting Hebrew Bible people